Let's Go to the Museum was a Canadian children's television series which aired on CBC Television from 1954 to 1956.

Premise
Robert MacNeil, later of the PBS NewsHour, hosted this series concerning museums and their artifacts. Episodes were based on location at a national museum in Ottawa, Ontario, Canada.

Scheduling
This half-hour series was broadcast on Tuesdays at 5:00 p.m. from 5 October 1954 to 5 April 1955 for its first season, then in the same time slot for its second season from 2 October to 18 December 1956. Features included demonstrations of how museum staff prepare models of First Nations people, and a location report at the Macoun Field Club.

External links
 
 
Let's Go To The Museum - Canadian Communication Foundation

CBC Television original programming
1950s Canadian children's television series
1954 Canadian television series debuts
1956 Canadian television series endings
Black-and-white Canadian television shows
Television shows filmed in Ottawa